Myojin Dam  is a rockfill dam located in Hiroshima Prefecture in Japan. The dam is used for power production. The catchment area of the dam is 1.4 km2. The dam impounds about 25  ha of land when full and can store 6145 thousand cubic meters of water. The construction of the dam was completed in 1976.

References

Dams in Hiroshima Prefecture